Paul Nicholas Rahman (born 9 September 1984 in Melbourne, Victoria, Australia) is a sport shooter who has twice represented Australia at the Summer Olympics.

At the 2004 Summer Olympics in Athens he participated in the men's skeet event, finishing tied for 15th position. At the 2008 Games in Beijing he finished 30th in the men's skeet.

References

1984 births
Living people
Australian male sport shooters
Skeet shooters
Olympic shooters of Australia
Shooters at the 2004 Summer Olympics
Shooters at the 2008 Summer Olympics
Sportsmen from Victoria (Australia)
Sportspeople from Melbourne